David Rynin (October 15, 1905 – February 24, 2000) was an American philosopher. He is known mostly as an exponent of logical positivism. He served as president of the Pacific division of the American Philosophical Association in the years 1956–7. Until his death, he was professor emeritus at the University of California, Berkeley.

References
Presidential addresses of the American Philosophical Association, 1951-1960, pg. 374, Prometheus Books, 2006

See also
American philosophy
List of American philosophers

20th-century American philosophers
Analytic philosophers
1905 births
2000 deaths